"Quarter Past Midnight" is a song by English indie pop band Bastille. It was released on 9 May 2018 as the lead single from their third studio album, Doom Days (2019). The song was written by Dan Smith, who handled the production along with Mark Crew.

Background
In an interview with NME, Smith said, "It's the first single from our new album and it's kind of like an opening scene-setter. It's about escapism, when you want the night to keep going and try to lose yourself in it for whatever reason. We wanted to capture that feeling and have it sound a bit raucous and messy and euphoric. We wanted to try something a bit different and new. We had a really good time making this record and wanted it to very much be one concise thing with a very distinct sound."

Music video
A music video to accompany the release of "Quarter Past Midnight" was first released onto YouTube on 23 May 2018 at a total length of three minutes and twenty-five seconds.

Track listing

Charts

Weekly charts

Year-end charts

Certifications

References

2018 songs
2018 singles
Bastille (band) songs
Songs written by Dan Smith (singer)
Virgin Records singles